Xcel-Arc is a New Zealand-based welding company that is owned by Esseti NZ Ltd. It was founded in 1994, providing welding machines across New Zealand. Today, it is one of the primary welding companies of New Zealand.

The company is headquartered in Palmerston North, Wellington, New Zealand.

History
The Xcel-Arc Welding NZ was founded in 1994 in New Zealand. It provides plasma cutters, TIG-welding, MIG, Arc welding machines, machine trolleys, and protective gear.

Xcel-Arc manufactures machines that comply Australian-New Zealand market standards AS/NZS60974-1 and EN 50199.

References

External links
Xcel-Arc Welding NZ

Welding
Companies based in Wellington